Carretero is a surname. Notable people with the surname include:

Andrés Manuel Carretero (1927–2004), Argentine essayist and self-taught historian
Héctor Carretero (born 1995), Spanish cyclist riding for Movistar Team
Joan Carretero (born 1955), mayor of Puigcerdà and minister in the Catalan Government
Nilo Carretero (born 1986), Argentine footballer
Ramón Carretero (born 1990), Panamanian racing cyclist
Roberto Carretero (born 1975), Spanish former professional tennis player

See also:
Andrés Carretero Pérez (born 1955), Spanish historian
Lluís Pujals i Carretero (born 1966), Catalan musician and painter

References